Britt Lomond (April 12, 1925 – March 22, 2006) was an American actor and television producer. Also credited as Glase Lohman.

Born in Chicago, Illinois, Lomond was raised in New York City. He received three Purple Hearts, a Silver Star, and a Bronze Star for his military service as an Army paratrooper during World War II.

He was a student at New York University after the war.

Lomond was active with NYU's fencing team, and he earned a place on the United States' fencing team for the 1952 Olympics. Instead of going that route, he began fencing as a professional in productions on stage and in films.

In 1956, Lomond played the Spaniard James Addison Reavis in the episode "The Baron of Arizona" of the anthology series, Death Valley Days, hosted by Stanley Andrews. In the story line, two newspapermen doubt Reavis' claim to millions of acres in the New Mexico Territory, which then included Arizona. Though Reavis' papers seem authentic and date to colonial times, the reporters prove them to be fraudulent.'

Lomond is best known for his role as Capitán Monastario in the first season of Disney's Zorro. He also played the role of General George Armstrong Custer in the Disney film Tonka. On television he made a guest appearance on Perry Mason as he played the role of title character and murder victim Jack Culross in the 1961 episode, "The Case of the Posthumous Painter." In 1963 Lomond appeared as Kyle Lawson on The Virginian in the episode titled "If You Have Tears."

He was a unit production manager for The Waltons, Somewhere in Time, and Falcon Crest. He was also known for being a first assistant director for Battlestar Galactica and MacGyver.

Death
On March 22, 2006, Lomond died of kidney failure at a nursing home in Huntington Beach, California, at age 80. He was survived by his wife, a son, and a daughter.

 Paintings 
Britt Lomond also painted.

BRITTINI was a commercial art studio in the 1960's, in Los Angeles, California. The studio was owned by three people, actor Britt Lomond, his father-in-law, and Loraine Miller.

In addition to producing vast numbers of "sofa art" paintings, the Brittini artists also did extensive muraling in the Grauman's Egyptian Theatre, in Hollywood, in 1964 (those paintings are now gone, the theatre has been remodeled). The paintings were usually of ships, with raised texture, using white glue tinted black with acrylic paint.

                

 Filmography 

1953: Death Valley Days (TV Series) - Lew Darby / Season 1, Episode 11 / "The Lady with the Blue Silk Umbrella" / credited as Glase Lohman
1955-1956: Navy Log (TV Series) - Lt. Fraser / Executive Officer / Carrigio
1956: Highway Patrol (TV Series) - Highway Patrolman Melton
1956: The Count of Monte Cristo (TV Series) - De Crissac
1956: Annie Oakley (TV Series) - Gentleman Jim Corbett
1956-1959: Death Valley Days (TV Series, in two episodes, one as James Reavis "The Baron of Arizona") - Kurt Mahler / Faro Bill / James Addison Reavis
1957: Cheyenne (TV Series) - Lt. Phil Poole
1957: The Saga of Andy Burnett: Andy's Love Affair (TV Series) - Captain Paco Reyes
1957: The Gray Ghost (TV Series) - Larson
1957-1958: Zorro (TV Series) - Capitán Monastario
1958: Tonka - Gen. George Armstrong Custer
1958-1959: 26 Men (TV Series) - Colonel Kesterlitzky aka 'El Tigre' / Dayton Borg
1959: Colt .45 (TV Series, in "A Legend of Buffalo Bill") - Buffalo Bill Cody
1959: Men into Space (TV Series) - Bruegel
1959: Tombstone Territory (TV Series) - Jay Pell
1959: Bat Masterson (TV Series) - Latimer
1960: Tales of Wells Fargo (TV Series) - Gerald Haggerty
1960: Young Jesse James - Yankee Officer
1960: The Brothers Brannagan (TV Series) - Larry Randolph
1960: Klondike (TV Series) - Clete Slade
1960-1961: The Life and Legend of Wyatt Earp (TV Series) - Johnny Ringo
1961: Lock Up (TV Series) - Patrolman Larry Wade
1961: Dick Powell's Zane Grey Theater (TV Series) - Logan Drew - the Atoner
1961: Thriller (TV Series) - Arnold Chase
1961: The Case of the Dangerous Robin (TV Series)
1961: Peter Gunn (TV Series) - Gil Manson
1961: Perry Mason (TV Series) - Jack Culross
1961: Rawhide (TV Series) - Dario
1963: The Virginian (TV Series) - Kyle Lawson
1967: I Spy (TV Series) - Psychologist
1967: Mission: Impossible (TV Series) - Thornton
1983: Simon & Simon'' (TV Series) - Jerry Gelson (final appearance)

References

External links 
 
 

Male actors from Chicago
American male film actors
American male television actors
1925 births
2006 deaths
20th-century American male actors
United States Army personnel of World War II